Xanthostege roseiterminalis is a moth in the family Crambidae. It was described by William Barnes and James Halliday McDunnough in 1914. It is found in North America, where it has been recorded from Texas.

The wingspan is 15–20 mm. The forewings are bright yellow with a purplish-pink terminal border. The hindwings are whitish. Adults have been recorded on wing in April.

References

Moths described in 1914
Pyraustinae